The Uganda National Roads Authority (UNRA) is a government agency mandated to develop and maintain the national roads network, advise the government on general roads policy, contribute to the addressing of national transport concerns, and perform certain other functions. UNRA is charged with, among other things, the selection of contractors, the supervision of construction, the scheduling of maintenance, and the prioritization of national road works.

Headquarters
The headquarters of UNRA are located in the UAP Nakawa Business Park, at 3-5 New Port Bell Road, in the Nakawa Division of Kampala, Uganda's capital and largest city. The geographical coordinates of UNRA's headquarters are:0°19'40.0"N, 32°36'46.0"E (Longitude:0.327778; Latitude:32.612778).

Overview
UNRA was established in 2006 by parliamentary enactment of the Uganda National Roads Authority Act. UNRA became fully operational on 1 July 2008.

UNRA is governed by a nine-member board of directors, chaired by Angela Kanyima Kiryabwire. The first Chairman of the Board of Directors was Mr. Chris Kassami who spearheaded the process of setting up the original UNRA management structures. The pioneer Executive Director was Eng. Peter Ssebanakitta who was appointed to the post on 1 November 2007 and set upon working with the Board to recruit staff into the UNRA structures. UNRA became operational on 1 July 2008 with about 80% of the established posts filled. Eng. Ssebanakitta served as Executive Director up to 3 March 2013 when he resigned for personal reasons. He was succeeded in acting capacity by Engineer Ssebbugga Kimeze who was subsequently replaced by Eng. James Okiror when he was suspended following the botched procurement of a contractor for the Mukono–Kyetume–Katosi–Nyenga Road. The current executive director is Allen Kagina who replaced Engineer Okiror in May 2014. She replaced acting executive director James Okiror.

Completed projects

According to a published report in July 2015,  (19 percent) of the  national road network was paved.

Some of the roads that have been completed since 2008 include:
 
 Kabale–Kisoro–Bunagana Road (completed in 2012)
 Fort Portal–Bundibugyo–Lamia Road (completed in March 2014)
 Gayaza-Ziroobwe Road
 Matugga-Kapeeka Road
 Soroti–Dokolo–Lira Road (completed in 2010)
 Jinja–Bugiri Road (completed in 2010)
 Kampala–Mityana Road (completed in July 2012)
 Masaka–Mbarara Road
 Lira–Kamdini–Karuma Road (completed in August 2011)
 Kazo–Ibanda–Kamwenge Road (completed in March 2014)
 Nyakahita–Kazo Road (completed in February 2014)

Ongoing construction projects
As of October 2017, the following major construction projects under UNRA's supervision were ongoing.

 Gulu–Atiak–Nimule Road
 Tororo–Mbale–Soroti Road
 Vurra–Arua–Koboko–Oraba Road
 Mbarara Northern Bypass Road
 Kampala Northern Bypass Highway
 Mbarara–Ntungamo–Kabale–Katuna Road
 Entebbe-Kampala Expressway
 New Jinja Bridge
 Mukono–Kyetume–Katosi–Nyenga Road
 Hoima–Kaiso–Tonya Road
 Hoima–Butiaba–Wanseko Road
 Kampala–Mpigi Expressway

Upcoming projects

As of June 2015, UNRA listed the following major construction projects as upcoming:

 Kigumba–Masindi–Hoima–Kabwoya Road
 Rukungiri–Kihihi–Ishasha–Kanungu Road

Re-organization
As part of a re-organization and re-structuring effort, Allen Kagina, the executive director, fired all the remaining 866 company staff and re-advertised all staff positions. The terminations were in addition to 80 managers fired in June 2015, and another 58 staff laid off in September 2015 when the procurement and weighbridge departments were outsourced. In January 2016, media reports indicated that the total staff allocation for the organization had been increased to 1,740.

Governance
In March 2017, new board of directors was named to serve for three years. The members of the current board are:

 Fred Omach: Chairman
 Allen Kagina: Executive Director
 Sam Bagonza: Member
 Umar Bagambadde: Member
 Joseph Muvawala: Member
 Laban Mbulamuko: Member
 Petra Sansa Tenywa: Member.

See also
Uganda Road Fund
Transport in Uganda
List of roads in Uganda

References

External links
Uganda National Roads Authority Website
Is The Huge Road Sector Budget Allocation Doing Wonders? 
UNRA: Construction of the Kampala – Jinja Expressway
Regional Imbalance: The Story of Road Construction In Uganda
UNRA At 6 Years - 1 July 2014

Organisations based in Kampala
Government agencies of Uganda
Roads in Uganda
Organizations established in 2008
2008 establishments in Uganda
Transport organisations based in Uganda
Road authorities